Capitán Solari is a village and municipality in the Sargento Cabral department in Chaco Province in northern Argentina.

References

Populated places in Chaco Province